The Brookfield Hustlers were a minor league baseball team based in Brookfield, Missouri. In 1911, the Hustlers were the first of two Brookfield teams that played as members of the Class D level  Missouri State League. After the Brookfield Hustlers folded early in the 1911 season, the Sedalia franchise moved to Brookfield. The Sedalia/Brookfield Cubs team was in 1st place when the Missouri State League folded during the season.

History
Minor league baseball began in Brookfield, Missouri in 1911. The Brookfield Hustlers began the season joined with the Jefferson City Senators, Kirksville Osteopaths, Macon Athletics and Sedalia Cubs as charter teams, beginning Missouri State League play on May 11, 1911.

On May 19, 1911, the Brookfield Hustlers folded with an 0–4 record, playing under manager Ginger Lyons.

Shortly after the Hustlers folded, minor league baseball returned to Brookfield. On May 24, 1911, the Sedalia Cubs were in 1st place with a 7–3 record, when the franchise moved to Brookfield, Missouri and became the Brookfield Cubs. The manager was J.T. Easley. After the Hustlers had folded, the Missouri State League continued play as a four–team league until it permanently folded on June 5, 1911. The Sedalia/Brookfield Cubs had a record of 11–8 and were in 1st place when the Missouri State League folded.

Photographs of the 1911 Brookfield Cubs listed players on the roster. Those listed were: S. Duvenick Pitcher, W. Shadwell 1st Base, C. Hall 2nd Base, L. McGurren Pitcher, H. Norman 2nd Base, E. Armstrong Short Stop, I. Shepard Middle Field, F. Miller Pitcher, P. Acock Pitcher, B. Stewart Left Field, R. Williams Right Field, B. Senior Pitcher, C. McLin Catcher, W. Owens Right Field, T. Duvenick Pitcher, J. Miller 3rd Base, H. Wilkinson Catcher and G.W. Buohl.

Brookfield has not hosted another minor league team.

Ballpark
The name of the home ballpark for the 1911 Brookfield minor league teams is not directly referenced. The East & West "Twin Parks" were in use in the era, having been established in 1859. Still in use today, they are located at the intersections of Main Street, John Street, Linn
Street and Park Street.

Timeline

Year–by–year record

References

External links
Baseball Reference

Defunct minor league baseball teams
Defunct baseball teams in Missouri
Missouri State League teams
Baseball teams established in 1911
Baseball teams disestablished in 1911